Eugamandus darlingtoni is a species of longhorn beetles of the subfamily Lamiinae. It was described by Fisher in 1942, and is known from Dominicana.

References

Beetles described in 1942
Endemic fauna of the Dominican Republic
Acanthocinini